The 1990 ITU Triathlon World Championships were held in Orlando, United States on September 15, 1990.

Results

Men's Championship

Women's Championship

References
the-sports.org
archive.triathlon.org

World Triathlon Series
World Championships
Triathlon World Championships
1990 in sports in Florida
1990s in Orlando, Florida
International sports competitions hosted by the United States
Triathlon competitions in the United States
Sports competitions in Orlando, Florida
International sports competitions in Florida